Doi Phi Pan Nam, is a 1,745 m high mountain in Southeast Asia, part of the Luang Prabang Range (ทิวเขาหลวงพระบาง).

It is at the east end of the Thai highlands, on the border between Laos and Thailand. The Wa River has its source beneath this mountain.

See also
Khun Nan National Park
List of mountains in Thailand

References

External links
Khun Nan National Park - Tourism Thailand

Mountains of Laos
Mountains of Thailand
International mountains of Asia
Laos–Thailand border
Luang Prabang Range